Michael McLean or Mike McLean may refer to:
 Michael McLean (broadcaster), Australian broadcaster who appears on Triple M
 Michael McLean (composer) (born 1952), American composer
 Michael McLean (violinist) (born 1966), American violinist and composer
 Michael McLean (footballer) (born 1965), former Australian Football League player
 Michael McLean (golfer) (born 1963), English professional golfer
 Michael McLean (rugby league), Australian former rugby league footballer
 Michael Dalton McLean (1880–1958), Conservative member of the Canadian House of Commons
 Michael S. McLean (born 1942), American director, editor and producer on films and TV shows
 Mike McLean (sprinter) (born 1970), Canadian track and field athlete
 Mike McLean (ice hockey) (born 1986), Canadian professional ice hockey player 
 Mike McLean (rugby league) (born 1963), Australian rugby league player

See also
 Mike McClean, British broadcaster